

VTVCab

VTVCab 1

VCTV1 

 
Bản tin nối mạng (thay cho Tiêu điểm 5-3-2-1)
Buôn chuyện
Ca nhạc quốc tế
Cẩm nang đẹp
Chọn sách cùng bạn
Chuyến đi cuối tuần
Chuyện đời thường
Chuyện riêng chuyện chung
Cuộc sống bốn phương
Du học và việc làm
Đất Việt quê tôi
Đời thường
Hành trang du học
Hành trình khám phá
Hoạt hình
Hương vị cuộc sống
Màn ảnh sân khấu
 Mỗi tuần một chuyến đi
Món ngon nhớ lâu 
Người của công chúng
Người Việt trẻ (thay thế Người của công chúng, phát sóng từ 2010)
Nhịp điệu giải trí (thay cho Tiêu điểm 5-3-2-1)
Nhịp điệu thời trang
Phong cách
Quán âm nhạc
Tạp chí 7/1 (thay cho Tiêu điểm 5-3-2-1)
Thế giới nghệ thuật
Thời sự 19h (tiếp sóng VTV1)
Tiêu điểm 5-3-2-1
Võ lâm tranh bá

Fansipan TV 

360 độ âm nhạc
Cafe với người nổi tiếng 
Chuyện đàn ông
Đẹp Fashion show 
Không thể không đẹp
Làm đẹp
Những sắc màu nhà Việt 
Nói ra đừng sợ
Phong cách nữ hoàng
Tư vấn nội thất

VIE Giải Trí (Giải Trí TV) 

2 ngày 1 đêm
Ai là số 1
Bí mật căn phòng
Cả nhà cùng cười
Các chương trình gameshow của Đông Tây Promotion
Châu Úc xinh đẹp
Chị ơi đi Hàn Quốc
Cuộc sống vui khỏe 
Cười đủ kiểu
Đẹp Fashion Show
Đêm của sao
Đưa em về nhà
Giây phút thảm họa
Hậu trường Showbiz
Khỏe đẹp cùng Yoga
Muốn ăn phải lăn vào bếp
Người ấy là ai?
Nhà có Xine Việt
Nhanh như chớp nhí
Rap Việt - The Rapper
Sao thế giới
Sao và sự kiện 
Siêu thử thách - Impossible Challenge
Siêu trí tuệ Việt Nam - The Brain Vietnam (phát sóng 2 mùa)
Tám thời chín sự
Thông tin tiêu dùng
Tin nóng 24 giờ

VTVCab 2 - ON Phim Việt 

Chuyện của sao
Góc thư giãn
Không gian đẹp
Nhà của sao
Nhịp cầu sức khỏe
Phim truyệnSắc màu cuộc sống
Siêu sao Phim Việt

 VTVCab 4 - ON Movies 

 VCTV4 - Kênh văn nghệ 

Ca nhạc theo yêu cầu
Dẫn chuyện thiếu nhi
Dân ca nhạc cổ (phát lại từ VTV)
Gạch nối tình yêu
Giao lưu âm nhạc
Music 4 Me
Nhạc chuông 360 độ
Quán âm nhạc (phát lại từ VCTV1)
Sân khấu (Kịch, cải lương, tuồng, chèo)

 M4me 

Bảng xếp hạng Keeng
Bình chọn nhạc QT
Bình chọn nhạc Việt
Bình chọn tổng hợp
M - Playlist
Mạng xã hội truyền hình 
M4me nhạc quốc tế
M4me nhạc Việt
M4me Top Idol
M4me update nhạc quốc tế 
M4me update nhạc Việt
MV mới – Nhạc Quốc tế
MV mới – nhạc Việt
Ngôi sao mùa hè
Nhạc Dance
Sắc màu âm nhạc
Thần tượng của ngày
Top 10 bình chọn nhạc Quốc tế
Top 10 bình chọn nhạc Việt
Top Clan
Vinh danh thần tượng của ngày
Vsao Voice
Vũ hội tình yêu
VZPlaylist

 Kênh 17 và Văn hoá 

Ánh sáng ngày mai
Ẩm thực & du lịch
Danh nhân đất Việt
Di sản Việt Nam 
Giai điệu cuộc sống
Góc nhìn Văn hoá
Hành trang sống
Hậu trường Showbiz (chuyển sóng từ VTVcab 6)
Hoàn thiện bản thân
Hot girl cà phê
Hồn Việt
Làm đẹp (chuyển sóng từ VTVcab 6)
Mái ấm yêu thương
Nghệ sĩ tháng
Quán cà phê âm nhạc
Sắc màu không gian
Sắc màu văn hóa
Tạp chí VZ
Trò chuyện với người nổi tiếng (chuyển sóng từ VTVcab 6)
Vietnam IQ
VZ 100 độ (trước là VZPlaylist)
VZ Hotlist (trước là VZPlaylist)

 Love Tò mò showbiz
Thanh âm diệu kỳ 
Vietnam IQ
Đối mặt
Bảng xếp hạng âm nhạc KPOP - Show! Music core
Nấu ăn cùng sao
Câu chuyện nghệ thuật
Thần tượng đến rồi
Cocktall âm nhạc
Tour de Vietnam
Mâm nhà Food club
Bất ngờ chưa
Nhà tù thần tượng 
Thử thách cùng thần tượng 
5 phút biết hết
Thế giới đó đây

VTVCab 5

RealTV 

113 Online
1000 cảm xúc Hà Nội
Bị cười
Blog âm nhạc
Cà phê cuối tuần
Câu hỏi từ cuộc sống ?
Đi - nhìn và hỏi
Đi nhớ hỏi
Funny Zone
Góc cuộc sống
Gương mặt Vpop
Hành trình 2468
Hành trình phá án
Hậu trường sự kiện
Hoàng tử bóng đá
Hot V Model
Khám phá ẩm thực
Không gian trẻ
Lovebus - Hành trình kết nối những trái tim
Một ngày một ngày...
Nếm và nấu 
Phong cách thời trang
RealTV Chart
RealTV Film
RealTV Stuff
Sức sống 1 bài ca
Tác giả là bạn
Thời sự 19h (tiếp sóng VTV1)
Thời trang Iris
Tiếng nói người dân
Trực tiếp bóng đá

E Channel 

Bản tin 2418
E-Music
E-News
E-Phim
Hành trình khám phá (ADT sản xuất)
MPlus
Du lịch kỳ thú
Hit Cover
Hồn Việt
Sân khấu truyền thống
Món ngon mỗi ngày

VTVCab 7 - ON O2TV

VCTV7 (2006-2011) 
Phim truyện
Phim điện ảnh

D-Dramas và Vie Dramas 

Phim Âu - Mỹ
Phim Châu Á
Phim Việt
Sống cùng D-DRAMAS, nay là Sống cùng Vie Dramas

VTVcab 

Alo 115
Bệnh khó nói
Các vấn đề y tế
Camera ON
Cảnh báo đỏ
Cảnh báo tội phạm
Cảnh báo từ cuộc sống 
Chuyện khó nói
Dấu vết vụ án
Đầu bếp của những ngôi sao
Giải mã vụ án
Giữ cho lá phổi khỏe mạnh 
Hài hại não 
Onedu (Dạy học trên truyền hình)
On News
Khỏe để đẹp hơn
Mâm nhà Food club
Music Store
Nhà tôi 3 đời bán thuốc 
Music Like
Sách và cuộc sống 
Sức khỏe và cuộc sống 
Tuổi vàng 
DJ Star 
Quý ông hoàn mỹ - The Next Gentleman 
V Music 
V Healthy

VTVCab 8 - ON Bibi 

 
Bé làm họa sĩ
Bữa tối của Bòn Bon
Chơi mà học
Ngôi nhà của bé
Ngôi sao BiBi
Nhảy cùng BiBi
Phim hoạt hình
Siêu sao tài năng nhí
Thế giới ABC
Trổ tài cùng bé
Tủ sách Bibi
Tủ sách của bé
Vương quốc tại sao
Xúc xắc lúc lắc
Xứ sở diệu kì

VTVCab 9 - ON InfoTV 

 
15 phút chứng khoán
An cư
Bạn đường
Bản tin 20h
Bản tin chứng khoán Info
Bản tin dịch vụ
Báo chí góc nhìn
Bản tin bất động sản
Bản tin đấu thầu
Bản tin kinh tế
Bản tin sáng cuối tuần
Bản tin thị trường
Bản tin Vàng & tiền tệ
Bản tin xuất nhập khẩu
Blog tối
Cà phê sáng
Chứng khoán ảo
Dạy Golf trên truyền hình - Khám phá Swing Việt
Đấu giá ngược
Đầu tư tài chính cuối tuần
Địa ốc Info
Điểm tin tối
Đừng hoảng sợ
Hành trình 0 độ
Info 360
Khách hàng thông thái
Khám phá công nghệ
Khỏe để sống vui
Kinh tế số
Ký sự khám phá
Lên sóng InfoTV
Lịch sự kiện văn hóa
Menu Info
Mua sắm 24/7
Nhịp sống 24h
Ống kính Info
Phổ biến kiến thức chứng khoán
Phổ biến kiến thức kinh tế
S+
Sàn bất động sản & vật liệu xây dựng
Sàn chứng khoán Info
Sàn giao dịch BĐS Info
Sàn Info
Sắc màu thể thao
Siêu thị hàng gia dụng
Siêu thị khuyên mãi
Siêu thị nhà đất
Siêu thị ôtô xe máy
Siêu thị sách
Siêu thị thời trang
Siêu thị việc làm
Tạp chí Info đầu tư
Tài chính thông minh
Tạp chí bất động sản
Tạp chí xuất nhập khẩu
Tài chính doanh nghiệp
Tạp chí kinh tế cuối tuần
Tạp chí tài chính quốc tế
Thế giới 23 độ 5
Thế giới có gì
Thị trường Info
Thời sự 19h
Tiêu dùng & thể thao
Tiêu dùng 365
Tin tức Info
Toàn cảnh báo chí thế giới
Trước giờ mở cửa
Xe hay

VTVCab 10 - ON Cine 

Phim truyện

O2TV 

9 tháng 10 ngày
24h Sống khỏe
Áo Blouse trắng
Ăn uống và sống khỏe 
Bác sĩ O2
Bản tin O2
Bạn nên biết
Bác sĩ tại gia
Bảo vệ gan bằng thảo dược 
Bệnh môi trường 
Bí ẩn đồ uống
Bí quyết sắc đẹp
Bí quyết sống khỏe
Blog trẻ thơ
Cả nhà phòng bệnh
Câu chuyện của tôi
Chị em làm đẹp 
Chính sách y tế & cuộc sống
Chia sẻ khoảnh khắc đời người
Cho răng chắc khỏe
Chọn sách cùng bạn
Chuyện bây giờ mới kể
Chuyện để đùa khó nói
Chuyện mỗi ngày
Chuyện mỗi người
Chuyện ngành Y
Chuyện nhà Quyềnh
Chuyện ông Đường 
Con đường thuốc Việt
Công nghệ Y học & cuộc sống
Cùng nhau ta giảm cân 
Cuộc sống vẫn tươi đẹp
Dành cho đôi mắt
Dance cho cuộc sống
Dành cho đàn ông 
Dạy nghề 
Dinh dưỡng hợp lý
Dinh dưỡng từ hoa quả
Dr Happy
Dùng thuốc đúng cách
Đái tháo đường, bạn nên biết 
Đầu bếp tại gia 
Đẹp cùng chuyên gia 
Đi & gặp
Đọc sách cùng bạn
Đối thoại với thầy thuốc
Đông y thế kỷ 21
Giải mã XY
Giờ chiến thắng đái tháo đường
Giờ chiến thắng ung thư
Giờ dành cho đàn ông 
Giờ dành cho đôi mắt
Giờ dành cho người đái tháo đường
Giờ dành cho trái tim 
Giờ hạnh phúc
Giờ trái tim
Giờ viêm gan
Giữ cho lá phổi khỏe mạnh 
Góc nhan sắc 
Góc nhìn O2
Gỡ rối
Hành trình tìm ánh sáng
Hỏi đáp
Hồ sơ bệnh án
Hội chẩn 
Huyết áp mỡ máu
Kết nối vì cuộc sống
Khám bệnh gì ? Ở đâu ?
Khởi động cuộc sống
Ki ốt thông thái
Lời chào buổi sáng
Mang âm nhạc đến bệnh viện
Máu, khởi nguồn sự sống 
Mình là phụ nữ
Ngôi sao hiến máu
Nguy cơ từ cuộc sống 
Nhà tôi
Nhan sắc
Nhật ký O2 
Những người con biển cả
Nòi giống Việt
Nụ cười ban mai
Nuôi con khôn lớn
Oxy cho cuốc sống
Ống kính bệnh viện 
Ống kính O2
Papa Mama
Phía sau men say và khói thuốc 
Phim châu Á
Phim truyện
Phòng chống mù lòa 
Quà tặng cuộc sống
Quảng cáo và sự thật 
Sách & cuộc sống
Sống chung với đái tháo đường
Sống cùng HIV
Sống khỏe
Sống khỏe với đái tháo đường
Sơ cứu ban đầu
Sức khỏe 360
Sự kỳ diệu của thảo dược
Tạp chí sức khỏe 
Thanh lọc cơ thể
Thành tựu y học
Thành tựu y học Việt Nam 
Thông điệp y tế
Thuốc Nam người Việt
Thuốc tốt thuốc hay
Thực đơn O2
Thực phẩm cho tương lai
Tôi đi chữa bệnh
Trà thế kỷ 21
Tuổi vàng
Tủ thuốc gia đình
Từ trang trại đến bàn ăn
Tư vấn sức khỏe
Tư vấn sức khỏe qua mạng Vinaphone
Vắc xin cuốc sống 
Vitamin +
Vui khỏe cùng sao
Yoga in Viet Nam

Vie Dramas 

 Sống cùng VIE Dramas
 Phim châu Á

VTVCab 11 - GS Shop

TV Shopping 

Chương trình mua sắm (2008-2015)
Top 5 sản phẩm 
Giờ vàng cuối tuần
7 ngày khuyến mãi 
Giờ vàng giá sốc
Thời điểm vàng mua hàng giá sốc
Giá sốc cuối năm
Người nội trợ đảm đang
Lắng nghe thị trường
Làm đẹp đón xuân
Mừng tuổi đầu năm trao quà ngày xuân
Giỏ quà Tết
Cuộc sống tiện ích

VGS Shop 

 Chương trình mua sắm

VTVCab 12 - ON Style TV
 
1 ngày cùng phong cách
7 nốt nhạc
25 phong cách ấn tượng 
Adam vào bếp
Ai đến hôm nay
Bản lĩnh đàn ông
Bàn tròn gia đình
Bàn tròn Showbiz
Bắt mạch tình yêu
Blog phong cách
Bố ơi, mẹ thích gì ?
Cẩm nang cười
Cẩm nang đẹp
Chat với ngôi sao
Chuyên mục cười 
Chuyện riêng chuyện chung 
Chuyện Showbiz
Con đường thời trang
Công sở kỳ truyện
Công sở truyền kỳ
Cuộc sống xanh
Cuxi Night
Dr Tin
Đám cưới trong mơ 
Đàn ông sau 5h
Đàn ông tỏa sáng
Đẳng cấp phái mạnh
Đẳng cấp thương hiệu 
Đẹp 24h
Đẹp như sao
Đẹp như nhà sao
Điểm đến cuối tuần
Điểm hẹn cuối tuần
Gia đình Style
Giá trị yêu thương
Giấc mơ hạnh phúc 
Giờ vàng mua sắm
Góc chuyên gia
Góc làm đẹp
Hài dân gian
Hành trình tóc
Hoa khôi thể thao 
Hương vị cuối tuần
Hương vị cuộc sống
Khám phá thương hiệu
Khỏe đẹp mỗi ngày
Khoẻ để sống vui
Không gian đẹp
Khúc ngẫu hứng 
Lăng kính cuộc sống 
Mẹ và bé
Mẹ yêu con
Món quà tình yêu
Mỗi tuần một chuyện
Một ngày một phong cách 
MS Box
Nào cùng dự tiệc 
Năng động mỗi sáng
Nghệ sĩ đường phố
Người mẫu
Người Việt hàng Việt
Nhạc Việt Online
Nhật ký nữ siêu mập Ruby
Nhịp cầu sức khỏe
Phía sau thành công 
Phong cách doanh nhân
Phong cách sao
Phong cách số
Phụ nữ thành công
Sắc màu 4 phương
Sắc màu cảm hứng
Style Chat
Style công sở
Style Matching 
Style Music
Sức sống hàng Việt
Thế giới đàn ông 
Thế giới vô lăng
Thời trang áo tắm
Tiêu dùng cuộc sống 
Tin hay không tin 
Tóc mới
Top Destination 
Tôi có thể - I Can Do That
Tôi đẹp tôi thay đổi 
Tôi phong cách
Tôi và xe
Trăng mật ngọt ngào 
Tư vấn tiêu dùng
Vũ điệu trang sức
Xe tuần qua
Xe và phong cách 
Xu hướng và sàn diễn
Yêu con

VTVCab 13 - VTV Hyundai 

Chương trình mua sắm (2016 - nay)

VTVCab 14 - VShopping 

Chương trình mua sắm (2019 - nay)

Lotte Đất Việt Homeshopping (2012 - 2019) 

Chương trình mua sắm (2012 - 2018)

VTVCab 15 - ON Music

Invest TV 

 
An ninh năng lượng
An sinh xã hội & đầu tư
Bán tin Tối
Bán tin tấc vàng
Bài học kinh nghiệm
Bình báo
Bình luận Invest
Câu chuyện đầu tư
Câu chuyện quốc tế
Chuyển động tài chính
Chứng khoán Invest
Công nghệ
Điểm đến Việt Nam
Invest 20h
Khám phá
Lăng kính chứng khoán
Let's go
Made in Vietnam
Phụ nữ làm kinh tế
Trực tiếp bóng đá
Sản xuất, tiêu dùng và thị trường
Sống đam mê
Sở hữu trí tuệ
Sự lựa chọn của nhà đầu tư
Tấc vàng Invest
Tấc vàng trong tầm tay
Thảm đỏ Việt Nam
Thông tin thương vụ 
Thời sự đầu tư
Thương hiệu Việt
Tuổi trẻ với WTO
Tủ sách doanh nhân
Văn hóa doanh nhân

M Channel 

18h Hot
Bí ẩn quanh ta
Trực tiếp bóng đá
Góc Fitness
Lửa thử vàng
M-Movie
M-Sports
Nam học
S&S - Chương trình về sức khỏe tình dục
Techman
Thời trang
Thú chơi
Xem ngay

UM Channel và VTVCab 

UM Chart
VMusic
Câu chuyện âm nhạc
Radio tình yêu
Ca nhạc (Trữ tình, Bolero, Nhạc trẻ,...)
Block V-pop
Block Asia
Block OST
Block Retro
Block nhạc mới
UM Special
UM Live Concert
Musiclike
Acoustic Cover
Cocktail âm nhạc
Chanh đa mùi
DJStar
Quý ông hoàn mỹ - The Next Gentleman

VTVCab 17 - Yeah1 TV

VCTV17 - Du lịch and Kênh 17 

Cuộc sống bốn phương
Di sản Việt Nam
Du lịch 357
Drama
Đi là đến
Đũa tre
Góc riêng của Sao
Hành trang sống
Hành trình khám phá
Hậu trường Showbiz
Khám phá tự nhiên
Ký sự rừng xanh
Lạ và quen
Làm đẹp
Nhịp sống
Những miền đất lạ
Phố
Sang trọng Việt Nam
Sắc màu không gian
Trò chuyện với người nổi tiếng
Việt Nam trong tôi
Vòng quanh thế giới

Yeah1 TV 

 
5PM - 5 giờ chiều
Alo Alo (phiên bản 2)
Anh áo đen
Bữa cơm của mẹ
Câu chuyện thời trang
Cơn bão V-Star
Đèn xanh cho tình bạn
Cặp đôi đại chiến 
Hello
Khỏe và đẹp
Kpop on Air
Ký sự rừng xanh
Lặng nhìn cuộc sống
Lớp học vui nhộn
Này bạn, bạn nghĩ sao (phiên bản 2)
Năng động ngày mới
Nhịp sống (chuyển sóng từ VTVcab)
Play
Rẽ trái, rẽ phải
Senbatsu Battle
Thực đơn 1102
Thư ký của Romeo
Trạm chờ xe buýt
Đi cùng Duy
Thư viện USUK
Thành phố tôi yêu
Ống kính
Hành khách bất ngờ
Yeah1 Countdown
Yeah1 On Stage
Đây chính là nhảy đường phố - Street Dance Vietnam

VTVCab 19 - Vie DRAMAS

FilmTV 

Chiếc hộp điện ảnh

VTVCab 20 - ON VFamily 

AZ Playlist
VZ Playlist
Ánh sáng ngày mai
Quán cà phê âm nhạc
Cảnh báo an toàn sống
Vitamin cho cuộc sống
Hoàn thiện bản thân
Trò chuyện với người nổi tiếng
Quán cà phê âm nhạc
Thực đơn đỉnh 
Đi là đến
Hương vị Việt
Cơm chay cửa thiền
Thể thao, sức sống và đam mê
Sơ cứu ban đầu
Hát vì yêu

VTVCab 21 - ON Kids

SaoTV (29/04/2016 - 31/03/2018) 

Phim hoạt hình
Phim thiếu nhi

VTVCab 22 - ON Life (Love Nature 4K) 

OnEdu (phát cùng với VTVcab 7)

ON Sports Network (by VTVCab)

ON Sports (VTVCab 3 - ThethaoTV Old name) 

10 phút thể dục
Arsenal TV
Arsenal 360
ATP Tour Uncovered
Bản tin cuối tuần
Billiard – Snooker
Bóng bàn vô địch thế giới của Trung Quốc
Bóng đá muôn nơi
Breaking News
Cafe 24
Cận cảnh
Câu chuyện tối thứ 3
Cầu mây nữ Việt Nam
Cuồng nhiệt cùng bóng đá
Cuồng nhiệt cùng thể thao
Dạy thể thao
 Đặng Phương Nam Show
Góc khuất
Football Country
Futbol Mundial
Giấc mơ thể thao`
Huyền thoại Action
Khai cuộc Bundesliga, Ligue1,....
Khỏe & đẹp
Không phải ai cũng biết
Làng cờ
Lăn cùng trái bóng
Mổ băng: Góc chiến thuật
Mổ băng: Tennis
Muôn màu thể thao
 Nhà vô địch
Omni Sport
ON Sports World
Phong cách sống
Phụ nữ với thể thao
Quần vợt quốc tế
Sôi động cuối tuần
Sôi động thể thao
Tạp chí ATP Tennis
Tạp chí ATP Tour
Tạp chí danh thủ
Tạp chí Golf PGA
Tạp chí huấn luyện viên vĩ thoại
Tạp chí Olympic
Tạp chí Ô tô và thể thao
Tạp chí Serie A
Tennis thế giới
Thể thao & cuộc sống
Thể thao và thời tiết
Thể thao +18
Thể thao bốn phương
Thể thao cập nhật
Thể thao ngoài trời
Thể thao tốc độ
Thế giới banh nỉ 
Thế giới Golf
Thế giới Ngoại hạng Anh
 Thế giới thể thao
Thể thao bốn phương
Thể thao nghệ thuật
Thể thao tổng hợp
 Thể thao Việt Nam
Thích thì thử
 Thời tiết & thể thao
Toàn cảnh thể thao điện tử
Toàn cảnh V-league
Tôi yêu bóng đá
Tôi yêu thể thao
 Tổng hợp V - League
Trái bóng tròn
 Tường thuật bóng đá 
 Tường thuật thể thao
V-League World

ON Sports+

VCTV6/VTVcab 6 - Kênh phổ biến kiến thức 

Các vấn đề xã hội
Các vấn đề giáo dục 
Câu chuyện khoa học
Công nghệ cuối tuần
Công nghệ khám phá
Công nghệ & cuộc sống
Công nghệ và đời sống
Chuyến đi cuối tuần (phát lại từ VCTV1)
Chuyện chung chuyện riêng (phát lại từ VCTV1)
Cùng nông dân bàn cách làm giàu
Dạy nghề
Dạy ngoại ngữ (Anh, Pháp, Trung, Hàn)
Danh nhân đất Việt
Dư địa chí truyền hình
Gìn giữ cho muôn đời sau (phát lại từ VTV2)
Hành trang du học
Hành trình khám phá
Khám phá thế giới
Khám phá tự nhiên
Khoa học và cuộc sống (phát lại từ VTV2)
Kiến thức xã hội
Kinh tế thương mại
Kinh tế xã hội
Làm quen với khoa học
Những miền đất lạ
Những sắc màu không gian
Những sắc màu văn hóa
Những mảnh ghép cuộc sống
Phim khoa học
Phim khoa học công nghệ nước ngoài
Phim tài liệu khoa học
Sắc màu văn hóa các dân tộc
Sức khỏe cho mọi người
Tạp chí giáo dục (phát lại từ VTV2)
Thông điệp thời gian
Thế giới công nghệ
Tìm hiểu tác phẩm điện ảnh
Tư vấn mùa thi
Tư vấn tuyển sinh (trực tiếp cùng VTV2)
Việt Nam – Đất nước – Con người
Vòng quanh thế giới
Y học bốn phương
Trực tiếp bóng đá

Các chương trình phát sóng từ 3/2013: 

Góc riêng của Sao
Hậu trường Showbiz
Làm đẹp (chuyển từ VCTV1)
Sắc màu không gian (chuyển từ VCTV1)
Trò chuyện với người nổi tiếng

Hay TV 

Bản tin 2418
Phim Hay 
VZ Hotlist

VTVCab, OnSports+ 

3F Pro
8 bóng đá
Bản tin giáo dục
Bản tin thể thao giải trí
Bản tin On Sports
Gõ cửa nhà fan
Tạp chí giáo dục
Mổ băng
Thể dục thể thao cho cuộc sống
Tường thuật 10 phút
Tường thuật bóng đá
Tường thuật thể thao
Amazing
Lập trình
Khoa học diệu kỳ
On Skills
On Edu Talk: Tư vấn tuyển sinh
Khám phá châu Âu
Luxury Life Style
Music Like
Lifestyle+
Music Store
Vmusic
Quý ông hoàn mỹ - The Next Gentleman

ON Football (VTVCab 16 - BongdaTV old name) 

Gameshow 3F
Bản tin thế giới
 Bóng đá Việt Nam
 Cuồng nhiệt 24/7
 Cuồng nhiệt cùng bóng đá
Đại lộ Bundesliga
 Đặng Phương Nam Show
EPL IN
Football Mundial 
 Góc khuất
Không phải ai cũng biết 
On Football Focus 
ON TIF
Nhà vô địch
Mổ băng
Mổ băng - Góc chiến thuật 
 Sân cỏ Chủ Nhật
Siêu kinh điển
Soccer Skills
 Talkshow bóng đá
Tạp chí bóng đá
 Thế giới thể thao
 Thể thao cập nhật
 Thể thao Việt Nam
 Thứ 7 cuồng nhiệt
Tiếp lửa ngoại hạng
Trái bóng tròn
 Tường thuật bóng đá
 Tường thuật V.League
 V.League Replay

ON Sports News Premium (VTVCab 18 - Thethao Tintuc HD old name) 

 Anh Ngọc & Calcio
Bản tin On Sports (phát lại từ On Sports+)
Bình luận thể thao
Bóng đá sân
Cà phê đội tuyển
Đại lộ Bundesliga
ES La Liga
Giấc mơ thể thao
 Gương mặt thể thao
Kpacb On Green
Laliga World 
 Nhà vô địch
ON Kết nối
Phía sau vinh quang 
 Tạp chí bóng đá (Ngoại hạng Anh, La Liga)
 Tạp chí quần vợt (ATP 500, ATP 250, Wimbledon)
 Thế giới thể thao
Thế giới Golf (phát lại từ On Golf)
 Thể thao Việt Nam
 Thời tiết & thể thao
 Tường thuật thể thao
Tường thuật bóng đá

ON Golf Premium (VTVCab 23 - Thethao HD Golf old name)

 3T World
 Bản tin Thế giới Golf
 Dạy Golf trên truyền hình
 Huyền thoại Golf
 Tạp chí Golf Golfing World
Trực tiếp các giải Golf PGA Tour / European Tour

ON Sports (Eng)

ON Sports News (Eng)

ON Football (Eng)

SCTV

SCTV Phim Tổng hợp 
Phim truyện

SCTV1 

 
 Bói...hát
 Công ty tá hỏa
Cười đa cảm xúc
 Gặp nhau cuối tuần
 Học viện ngôi sao
 Làng cười cười cả làng
Phim truyện
Sống ở Việt Nam
Nghệ sĩ và cuộc sống 
Trò chuyện cùng nghệ sĩ
 Tám xuyên Việt
 Táo quân ở trọ
Thách cười
 Thiên thần 1001
 Thư giãn cuối tuần

SCTV2

YanTV & UNI Channel 

2NE1 TV live worldwide
8 văn phòng
100 độ Yan
360 Hà Nội
American Best Dance Crew
Awesome - Vui thỏa thích
Back To Back
Bản đồ Yan
Bản tin giải trí - Wazzup
Bánh Gato
Bếp chiến
BFF - Sát cánh cùng thần tượng
Bling Bling
Ca nhạc
Chất riêng của tôi
Chỉ có thể là Yan
Dancing With The City
Designer Marathon - Chân dung nhà thiết kế
DJ World 
Đẹp 360
Đẹp hơn mỗi ngày 
Đi ăn cùng sao
Điện ảnh trong tầm tay
Electro
Fashionista
Ghế đỏ
Giờ phim ngắn
Gương mặt kế tiếp
Hạt giống âm nhạc
Hiphop Central
Hi5
Hey Yo
I Love Vpop
I Want to work for Diddy
JK Mania
Không gian ký ức
KPOP
Leo&U 
Love Song
Lucky 6
M!Scandal
M&M
Màu thời gian
MIX
New Beat
Mộc - Unplugged
Mối tình đầu
Một ngày mới
Một vòng trải nghiệm
MTV Exit
Mustang
Mùa hè trên nông trại khoai tây
Mùa hè vui nhộn
Music ATM
MVs/Zoom
My exclusive YanTV
Nhà là để trọ
New Hits
New Ring Tunes
Ngẫu hứng âm nhạc
Nhòm nhèm
Ối trời ơi
Phía sau camera
Play Me
Pop Profile
Rada 123
Radio 88.8
Rew
Revive Funbike
Rock on Yan
Sao A-Z
Sao 24/7
Sao quân sư
Sắc màu Việt Nam
Sẵn sàng khám phá
Số 6 may mắn
Star Buzz
Tạp chí thời trang
Thần tượng âm nhạc Việt Nam 
Vui cùng Thần tượng âm nhạc
Hành trình đến với thần tượng
Thực đơn Vpop
Tích tắc
Tôi dám hát
Trổ tài sao
UDJ
Ước mơ cùng Yan 
WE10
We Got Married
Wide News
Win10
Win at Yan
Video Fashion News
VJ Show
VMA Flash 
VPOP+
X2
Yan Around - Một vòng trải nghiệm
Yan Asia
Yan Break
Yan Chat
Yan Cine
Yan Me
Yan Live
Yan Special
Yan Star - Không ai khác ngoài bạn
Yan VIP
Yan Vpop 20
Yan yêu
Zoom - Spotlight

AMC 

Chạy đi chờ chi
Chạy đi chờ chi mini
V LIVE Shows
V LIVE Shows: Tám đầy chất xám
V LIVE Shows: XX Music Show
SB / MV / AMC PLAY
Siêu tài năng nhí - Super 10

Net Star

Nghìn lẻ 1 chuyện
Hiểu và thương
Đặc sản miền sông nước
Cine Box

SCTV3

SaoTV (1/6/2008 - 31/12/2015) & SEETV (1/1/2016 - nay) 

Vui nhộn cùng Aston
Bí mật cơn lốc Ninjago
Túi ba gang
Bạn có biết
Những ngôi sao nhỏ
Mẹ vắng nhà, ba là siêu nhân (Korea version)
Ngôi sao nhí

SCTV4

Yeah 1TV 

2!Idol
51 Job - Thỏa sức nghề nghiệp 
1+1=1
4 ngày yêu
360 độ Yeah
A2Z
Alo Alo
Alo Radio
Bật mí bí mật sao
Bí mật hậu trường
Bí mật teen
Biệt đội Siêu Xoáy
BringIt
Bước nhảy xì tin
Casting Model
Câu chuyện âm nhạc
Chinh phục
Chinh phục lọ lem
Chương trình tổng hợp
Cocktail Âm nhạc
Cover Hit
Cơn bão 8
Du lịch cùng teen
Đêm ngàn sao
Điệp vụ tình yêu
EcoX
Em yêu Sài Gòn
Giới trẻ vào bếp
Hát hay, hay hát
Hát tự nhiên 
Hậu trường vui nhộn
Hết ga
Hiphop Zone
Hit tôi yêu
Hot Music
I - music
If You Can - Nếu bạn có thể
I Love K-Pop
I Love Music
I-movie
Jukeon
K Music
Kênh thứ 7
Key Life
Khoảnh khắc thay đổi số phận
Leo's Show
K-Pop Zone
Mic Rubic
Mirinda
Mồ hôi tím
Music Top 20: Bảng xếp hạng âm nhạc quốc tế
Nấc thang âm nhạc
Này bạn, bạn nghĩ sao
Nhật ký phong cách
Nhiệt kế trái tim
Sao Sao
Sinh nhật Sao
Style+
Style & Star
Style & Star - Xinh cùng sao
Tám tất tần tật
Teen Balô
Teen Diary - Nhật Ký Ô Mai
Teen Sport - Trẻ, khỏe và đẹp
Thật & Thách Show
Thế giới Pha lê
Tiếng nói Teen
Tín đồ Shopping
Tôi làm DJ
Tổng đài Sao
Tôi và tuổi teen
Trước ống kính
US-UK Music
Vui cùng Sao
Y! oh cha cha
Yeah1 City
Yeah1 Countdown
Yeah1 Enter
Yeah1 fashion - Nhật ký pha lê
Yeah1 Music
Yeah1 Photographer 
Yeah1 Shopping
Yeah1 Star: gương mặt âm nhạc
Yeah1 Studio

STC 

Nhịp sống 365

GChannel 

Phim truyện

Let's Viet 

 Chuyện lý chuyện tình
 Đấu trường bò
 Hội xuân Văn nghệ sĩ
 Let's Cà phê
Let's Cà phê: Góc nhân ái
Let's Cà phê: Let's Showbiz
 Lục lạc vàng
 MAX Muay Thái
 Nhịp cầu ước mơ
 Phóng sự thực tế
 Sắc màu giải trí
 Siêu thị cuộc sống
 Sống xanh
Sự cố bất ngờ
 Thai FIGHT
 Thế giới trẻ
 Thế giới trong mắt trẻ thơ
 Trò chơi truyền hình xuyên Quốc gia

SCTV 

 
An toàn sống
Chuyện nóng 24h
Nhịp sống hôm nay
Sự cân bằng hoàn hảo
Phim truyện
Tạp chí thể thao

SCTV5

TVS 

Chương trình mua sắm (2008-2011)
Lao động & việc làm
Siêu thị địa ốc
Siêu thị khuyến mãi
Siêu thị nhà sách văn
Thời trang & làm đẹp
Ẩm thực Sài Thành

SCJ 

 Chương trình mua sắm (2011 - nay)
15 phút vàng

SCTV6

Sóng Nhạc & SCTV 

24h làm đẹp
Chat với sao
Ca nhạc tổng hợp
Cuộc đua kỳ thú
Doanh nghiệp & doanh nhân
Dòng thời gian
Điểm hẹn cuối tuần
Đường đến ước mơ
Đàn ca tài tử Nam Bộ
Đẹp Fashion
Giai điệu Phương Nam
Hương vị ẩm thực
Hương sắc Việt
Hành trang du học
Không gian hoàn hảo
Khám phá Việt Nam
Kinh tế hội nhập
Kỹ năng cuộc sóng
Không gian âm nhạc
Lời yêu thương
Một thoáng hương quê
Niềm vui bất ngở
Nhạc nhẹ
Ống kính SNTV
Ống kính thời trang
Phía sau ánh hào quang
Phong cách teen
Phát triển thương hiệu
Sài Gòn cà phê
Tập chí âm nhạc
Tạp chí tiêu dùng
Tạp chí kinh tế
Tạp chí sống nhạc
Thị trường mua sắm
Trò chuyện với nghệ sỹ
Tác giả & tác phẩm
Vui Vui Fishing

SNTV (IMC) 

3-8
360 độ làm đẹp
Bà con ơi
Cẩm nang dưới gối
Chiếc cân may mắn
Chuyện nhà mình
Chúng tôi là phụ nữ
Điểm hẹn cuối tuần
Hành trang du học
Hương vị ẩm thực
Không gian hoàn hảo
Ống kính thời trang
Phim truyện
Thú cưng TV
Top Việt Nam
Tư vấn sức khỏe và tiêu dùng
Vui vui Fishing
Vươn tới ước mơ

Fim360 (Viettel Media) 

 Fim Trung (Phim Trung Quốc)
 Fim Rạp (Phim Chiếu Rạp)
 Fim Thái (Phim Thái Lan)
 Fim Việt (Phim Việt Nam)
 Fim Hàn (Phim Hàn Quốc)
 8 Fim (8 Phim)
Chảo lửa thách đấu - Xgaming
Mẹ vắng nhà, ba là siêu nhân
Nhà hát truyền hình
Phim truyện
Sao nhập ngũ

SCTV7 - SHOWTV (STC & Sàn Diễn 360) 

Cẩm nang 365
Cẩm nang sức khỏe
Sống khỏe hơn - Sống lâu hơn
Tận hưởng cuộc sống
Di sản văn hóa
Sàn diễn cuối tuần
Hiểu đúng bệnh - Chữa đúng cách
Nhịp sống 365
Khỏe đẹp cùng nghệ sỹ

SCTV8 (VITV)

Hàn thử biểu
Đối thoại
Hộp tin Việt Nam
Tâm chấn
Dự báo thời tiết
Chào Việt Nam 
Xây dựng và Bất động sản
Giờ thứ 9
Tin mới (9h, 15h, 17h)
Xuất nhập khẩu
Bữa sáng doanh nhân
Năng động châu Á
Sắc màu muôn phương 
Tiêu điểm
Bàn tròn doanh nghiệp
Chuyển động châu Âu
Vòng xoáy châu Mỹ
Điểm sóng - Hot Stock
Điểm sóng
Luật sư của doanh nghiệp
Tiêu điểm vàng
Trên từng kinh tuyến
Kinh tế toàn cầu
Startup 360
Câu chuyện thời trang
Diễn đàn CEO
Tiêu điểm kinh tế
Thế giới sự kiện
Tạp chí ngân hàng
Khám phá thương hiệu
Việt Nam & tiềm năng
Môi trường kinh doanh
V Tài chính
Chứng khoán ngành
Into Vietnam
100° Fashion
Lăng kính
Thư viện doanh nhân 
ART World
Hành trình tri thức
Thế giới kỳ quan
Tạp chí Golf
Sắc màu muôn phương
Báo chí Kinh tế tuần qua
Kinh tế tuần qua
Luật sư doanh nghiệp
Vietnam - EU Biz
VITV & More
Chứng khoán cuối tuần
Tài chính thuế
Thể thao tuần qua
Phim truyện
Biz Compass
VITV gặp gỡ

SCTV9 
Phim truyện châu Á

SCTV10 - VTV Hyundai

HSN - Home Shopping Network

HSV - Home Shopping Vietnam

AZSHOP (2013 - 31/03/2020)

Sao Nam Shopping (01/01/2017 - 01/11/2019)

SCTV11

KOD 

Âm nhạc theo yêu cầu
Hát trên truyền hình
Top Hit

TVStar 

Giai điệu vàng (phát sóng trên SCTV20)
Khúc vọng vàng son
SZ Bolero - Những nốt nhạc ngân
Thử tài đọc Trailer
Tình khúc Bolero
Tôi là ai

SCTV12 

Đồng hành cùng Saigontourist
Nhanh nhanh vào bếp
Nét ẩm thực Việt
Sống ở Việt Nam
Chuyến xe mê ly
Đố vui động vật
Tour de Vietnam
Giới thiệu các điểm du lịch
Ẩm thực
Du lịch & khám phá
Đi tìm món ngon
Chuyến xe hương sắc vị
Một ngày trải nghiệm tại The Cillf Resort
1001 nơi tôi đến
Địa lý hay sinh vật
Khám phá
Thế giới động vật
Dinh dưỡng cho người bệnh
Phóng sự, ký sự
Mỗi ngày một chuyến 
Chinh phục Tây Bắc
Món ngon 365
Du lịch miễn phí
Hành trình 360 độ
Điểm hẹn du lịch
Món ngon đãi tiệc
Du lịch cùng sao
Khám phá miền Tây
Việt Nam đa dạng cuộc sống 
Saigon Tourist - Tận hưởng bản sắc Việt
Phim tuyên truyền 
Cung đường vàng Tây Bắc
Shoe Cooking
Hồ sơ hoang dã - Wild Case Files

SCTV13 - LadyTV (TVF - Phụ nữ & Gia đình) 

Nè biết gì chưa
Thợ săn trứng rồng
Siêu ảo thuật gia
Khám phá thế giới
Thể thao sức sống và đam mê
Thương hiệu Việt - Hàng Việt với cuộc sống
Hoàn thiện bản thân
Phụ nữ chúng mình
Làng trong phố - phố trong làng
Chuyện thảm đỏ
Sổ tay nội trợ
Góc khuất
Cảnh báo an toàn sống 
Sao muôn màu

SCTV14 - Kênh phim Việt 

Giai điệu Phim Việt
Kết nối Phim Việt
Petrolimex ký sự
Sở thích ngôi sao
Tui hỏi sao trả lời

SCTV15 - SSport2 
Bản tin Ssports
Toàn cảnh Ssports
Tường thuật thể thao 
Trò chơi tương tác
Sắc màu ngoại hạng

SCTV HD Thể thao

SCTV16

Fox Action Movies (01/01/2015 - 31/12/2020)

SCTV17 - SSport 

Bản tin Thế giới ESport
Hola Liga
Hẹn hò cùng SSport

SCTV18 - Kênh 18 

Phát lại các chương trình của các kênh SCTV.
Phim truyện

SCTV19 - Channel T 

Phim truyện

SCTV20 

Bóng thời gian
Bức tranh âm nhạc
Khúc hoài niệm
Khúc từ tình
Khúc xuân nồng
Màu thời gian
Mộc (Unplugged)

iTV (Việt Nam) 

BeatUp
Ca khúc kinh điển
iTV Now Việt Nam/Quốc tế
iMusic Top Hits Việt Nam/Quốc tế
iRing Top Hits
iTV Remix
iCover
iPlaylist
OST
Phim ngắn (Sitcom)
Tình khúc Bolero

SCTV21 - Việt Nam Ký Ức 

 
Yoga - Sự trải nghiệm
Chuyện giản dị
Sống yêu thương
Di sản văn hóa
Ký ức Việt
Tre xanh
Nghệ thuật Việt
Thái cực quyền
Văn hóa ẩm thực Việt
Nhất nghệ tinh
Một ngày làm người Việt
Phim tài liệu
Chiếu bóng
Thiền trong cuộc sống
Nét hà thành
Hồ sơ văn hóa Việt
Ai là ai
Khỏe để An Viên
Ký ức phú sa

SCTV22 - SSport1 

Tường thuật thể thao

SCTV 4K

SCTV HD Sàn diễn

SCTV HD Phim Việt

K+

K+ SPORT 1 

1 kèm 1
Phim điện ảnh
Phim truyền hình
Chat với huyền thoại
Chelsea cùng khoảnh khắc bất tử
Khai cuộc rực lửa
Cuối tuần rực lửa
K+ Sport Podcast
Phỏng vấn ngôi sao
Chân dung ngoại hạng
Góc nhìn huyền thoại
Câu chuyện ngoại hạng
Bản tin thể thao - News Room
Bản tin cập nhật - News Now
Đội tuyển tôi yêu
Đường tới nước Nga
Hành trình Copa America 2019
Hội quán ngoại hạng
Khai cuộc ngoại hạng
Hồi ức ngoại hạng
Khoảnh khắc ngoại hạng
Những biểu tượng Champions League 
My Club - Câu lạc bộ của tôi
Người hùng ngoại hạng
Top 10 tuyệt tác
EPL bàn thắng giữa tuần
Sa bàn - Data Room
Super Match
Super Sunday
Multifoot
Tạp chí bóng đá
Tạp chí UEFA Champions League, UEFA Europa League, Giải bóng đá Ngoại hạng AnhThế giới bàn thắngThế giới ngoại hạngThứ bảy ngoại hạng
Thứ 9 ngoại hạngPhim tài liệu thể thaoThế giới bàn thắng - Goal StreamTrận đấu 5 phútTrận đấu 10 phútTrên đỉnh châu Âu
Trên đỉnh châu Âu: IQTường thuật thể thaoTường thuật bóng đáSport+Speed+Huyền thoại Ngoại hạng Anh
Phạm Tấn & Anh Quân: The Fact & Views 
Nhà vua ngoại hạng
Arsenal cùng khoảnh khắc bất tử
Vua phá lưới ngoại hạng
Vũ điệu sân cỏ Ngoại hạng Anh
Gary Neville - Ký ức sân cỏ
EPL - Đội hình sân cỏ

 K+ SPORT 2 

Đội tuyển tôi yêu
Phim truyền hình
Phim tài liệu
Phim điện ảnh
Phim Sitcom
Gameshow
Chương trình thực tế
Khai cuộc ngoại hạngTạp chí bóng đá: UEFA Champions League, UEFA Europa League, Giải bóng đá Ngoại hạng Anh,...Thế giới ngoại hạng
Thứ bảy ngoại hạng
Trên đỉnh châu Âu
Trên đỉnh châu Âu: IQTường thuật thể thaoTường thật bóng đáTennis+Speed+Tạp chí thể thao: ATP, PGA Tour, UFC, Cage Warrious, WRC, Indycar SeriesKỹ thật ATPNgười dẫn đầuẤn tượng ATP TourDấu chân siêu hổ K+ CINE Các cặp đôi Hollywood 
Phim hay xem ngay! Clip ca nhạc - Music ClipPhim chiếu rạpPhim điện ảnh và những ngôi saoPhim Việt cuối thángLên đèn - Lights OnPhim truyền hình đỉnh caoTường thuật bóng đá
Super Match
Canal+ Football Plus
Trận đấu 5 phút
Multifoot
Nhà ảo thuật
Đội bóng vinh quang 
Phút bù giờ
Khoảnh khắc điện ảnh
Điểm hẹn thể thao   
Tạp chí thể thao 
Thứ 7 ngoại hạng
Tôi sẽ làm bất cứ điều gì
Hành tinh vuông
Phim tài liệu
Trận đấu 10 phút
Điểm hẹn
Khoảnh khắc Jennifer
Người truyền lửa
Leak +
Music +Ngôi sao điện ảnhMón ngon nhà làm

 K+ LIFE 

Bếp của mẹLên đèn - Lights OnMuzik+
Chương trình thực tế
Ca nhạc
Gameshow
Thế giới động vật
Chương trình thiếu nhi
Khám phá thế giớiClip ca nhạc - Music ClipChương trình Xuân - Đón năm mới (Tiếp sóng trên VTV vào đêm giao thừa âm lịch hằng năm)Phim hay xem ngayPhim điện ảnh cuối tuầnPhim truyền hìnhPhim Việt cuối thángTường thuật bóng đá (Trực tiếp)Tường thuật thể thao (Trực tiếp)Super Match

 K+ KIDS 
Chuyên gia ngoại hạng nhí Phim hoạt hìnhMTV Vietnam

 Broadcasting 

 Music Video 

Bài hát của tuần
Chart Attack
It's Your MTV
K-Wave
MTV Flashback
MTV Fresh
MTV Hits
MTV Indie (khuya 4h30 hàng ngày)
MTV Party Anthem
MTV Push
MTV Rock (khuya 4h hàng ngày)
MTV Urban (khuya 3h từ thứ 2 đến thứ 7)
Việt Hits

 Liveshow 

 MTV World Stage
 MTV Unplugged
 The Show

 Other 

 Catfish: The TV Show
 Celeb Ex In The City
 Celebrity Bumps: Famous and Pregnant
 Deliciousness
 Double Shot at Love with DJ Pauly D and Vinny
 Ex On The Beach
 M List
 MTV At The Movie
 MTV Cribs US
 MTV Cover
 Ngẫu hứng âm nhạc
 Ridiculousness
 The Challenge: Spies, Lies & Allies

 Defunct broadcast 

MTV 8 
MTV Thích mê - Most Wanted
Viet Must
MTV Series (phát sóng đến 9/12/2021 với bộ phim cuối cùng là Trò chơi tình ái)
Thần tượng đột kích - MTV School Attack
MTV Exit
Tìm kiếm tài năng - Vietnam's got talent
Star @ MTV
MTV Wow
 MTV NOW
Bước nhảy xì tin 
Đại sứ ước mơ
Việt Essential (phát sóng đến 23/5/2021)
Japan Hits
MTV Top Ten
MTV Top 5
MTV Chart Attack Top 5
MTV Musika
Punk'D
OK Karaoke
Moving In
Vietmust 
MTV News 
MTV @ The Movies

Other
Sports event
VTVCabĐường tới Seagames/World Cup/Euro/Olympic...Nhật ký Seagames/World Cup/Euro/Olympic...Tôi yêu World Cup (2014)
Ngôi sao World Cup (2014)
Muôn màu World Cup (2010)Muôn màu SeagamesBình luận World Cup/Euro/Seagames...Khai cuộc VLeagueSôi động VLeague'''SCTV
K+

Promotional programs
VTVCabHành trình VCTVKết nối VTVCabVCTV tương tác VCTV kết nốiVới khán giả VCTV''

SCTV

See also 
List of programmes broadcast by Vietnam Television
List of programmes broadcast by HTV#HTVC
List of programmes broadcast by VTC

References

Vietnam
Original programming by Vietnamese television network or channel